The Jamia Millia Islamia metro station is located on the Magenta Line of the Delhi Metro which was inaugurated on 25 December 2017 by Prime Minister Narendra Modi.

Jamia Millia Islamia is part of Phase III of Delhi Metro, on the Magenta Line.

History

Construction

The station

Structure
Jamia Millia Islamia elevated metro station situated on the Magenta Line of Delhi Metro.

Station layout

Connections

Bus
Delhi Transport Corporation bus routes number 274, 400, 402CL, 403, 403CL, 403STL, 463, 507CL, 507STL, 534C, 894, 894CL, 894STL  serves the station.

E-rickshaw 
DMRC flagged off 25 GPS enabled e-rickshaws called ETO which will provide last mile connectivity within an area of 3-4 kilometers. The rickshaws, which could be booked through the ETO app, will ply from 6AM to 11PM and charge ₹10 for the first 2 kilometers and ₹5 for each subsequent kilometre.

Entry/Exit

See also

Delhi
List of Delhi Metro stations
Transport in Delhi
Delhi Metro Rail Corporation
Delhi Suburban Railway
Delhi Monorail
Delhi Transport Corporation
South East Delhi
Jamia Millia Islamia
Okhla Sanctuary
Okhla barrage
Kalindi Kunj
National Capital Region (India)
List of rapid transit systems
List of metro systems

References

External links

 Delhi Metro Rail Corporation Ltd. - official site
 Delhi Metro Annual Reports
 
 UrbanRail.Net – descriptions of all metro systems in the world, each with a schematic map showing all stations.

Delhi Metro stations
Railway stations in India opened in 2017
Railway stations in South East Delhi district